Otto Eduard Gotfried Ernst Höfler (10 May 1901 – 25 August 1987) was an Austrian philologist who specialized in Germanic studies. A student of Rudolf Much, Höfler was Professor and Chair of German Language and Old German Literature at the University of Vienna. Höfler was also a Nazi from 1922 and a member of the SS Ahnenerbe before the Second World War. Höfler was a close friend of Georges Dumézil and Stig Wikander, with whom he worked closely on developing studies on Indo-European society. He tutored a significant number of future prominent scholars at Vienna, and was the author of works on early Germanic culture.  refers to him as "perhaps most famous and probably most controversial representative" of the "Vienna School" of Germanic studies founded by Much.

Early life and education
Otto Höfler was born in Vienna on 10 May 1901 to a highly educated upper middle class family. His father, Alois Höfler, was Professor of Philosophy and Pedagogy at the University of Vienna. Alois was a passionate admirer of Richard Wagner, and the author of a book on the Germanic god Odin. Otto's mother, Auguste Dornhöffer, was from Bayreuth and also a Wagner admirer.

Höfler studied German and Nordic philology at the University of Vienna from 1920 to 1921 under Rudolf Much. Höfler joined the Wiener Akademischer Verein der Germanisten, a völkisch group of German academics in 1921. He joined the Austrian Nazi Party in 1922 after hearing Hitler speak in Vienna.

He subsequently continued his studies in Nordic philology at the universities of Lund, Kiel (under Andreas Heusler), Marburg and Basel. He completed his PhD at the University of Vienna in 1926 with the dissertation Altnordische Lehnwortstudien, which examined loanwords in Old Norse.

Career
From 1928 to 1934, Höfler was a lecturer in German at Uppsala University. At Uppsala, Höfler befriended the fellow philologists Stig Wikander and Georges Dumézil, who would remain lifelong friends and intellectual collaborators. He completed his habilitation at the University of Vienna in 1931 with the dissertation Kultische Geheimbünde der Germanen, which examined secret societies of the early Germanic peoples. It had a major influence on the future research of Wikander and Dumézil, who would later examine similar societies among Indo-Iranians and Indo-Europeans.

From 1935 he lectured at the University of Kiel. In that same year he became a member of the selection committee for the Reichsberufswettkampf, an organization associated with the SS. From 1938, Höfler was Professor and Chair of Germanic Philology and Ethnology at the University of Munich. Also in 1938, he became a leader of the SS Ahnenerbe, an organization he had joined in 1937, and which was partially responsible for him receiving his position in Munich. His research centered on early Germanic culture, particularly early Germanic religion and literature. Höflers Deutsche Heldensage (1941), which examined Medieval German literature, was highly influential, and republished in 1961. Höfler argued in favor of cultural continuity between modern Germans and early Germanic peoples.

Höfler was fired from the University of Munich in 1945, and was subsequently prohibited from teaching. In 1950, he received a license to teach Scandinavian studies. In 1954, Höfler was appointed Associate Professor of Nordic Philology and Germanic Antiquity at the University of Munich. Although nominally Associate Professor, Höfler was for all practical purposes a full Professor during this time. Among his notable students at Munich were Heinrich Beck and Otto Gschwantler.

In 1957, Höfler was appointed Professor and Chair of German Language and Old German Literature at the University of Vienna. Gschwantler accompanied him as an assistant, and would eventually become a full professor. A talented and highly popular teacher, Höfler taught and supervised a generation of very influential scholars at Vienna, including Helmut Birkhan, Hermann Reichert, Peter Wiesinger, Erika Kartschoke, Edith Marold, Klaus Düwel, Waltraud Hunke and Wolfgang Lange. A group of Höfler's most dedicated students, which included Gschwantler, Birkhan, Wiesinger and Kartschoke, were affectionately known as the Drachenrunde.

Retirement
Höfler retired from teaching 1971, but continued to teach and research. After his retirement, Höfler worked on refining his earlier theories, and authored extensive studies on Dietrich von Bern and Siegfried, the two most important characters in Medieval German literature. He argued that Siegfried was derived from the Germanic chieftain Arminius, who defeated the Roman army in the Battle of the Teutoburg Forest in 9 AD.

Death and legacy
Höfler died in Vienna on 25 August 1987. Höfler's scholarship and legacy are controversial. Höfler had a major influence on Georges Dumézil's trifunctional hypothesis of Indo-European society. He worked closely with Dumézil and scholars such as Stig Wikander, Émile Benveniste and Jan de Vries on developing study on Indo-European mythology, and has been credited with having significantly contributed to reviving the field of comparative mythology. According to Price, though Höfler's early career was shaped by the political changes of the times, the actual content of his works were of high quality and not tainted by political bias. Rowe says that though criticized by some, Höfler's key theories has never been refuted. Price argues Höfler's research has continued to be of great relevance up to the present day.

On the other hand,  argues that Höfler’s work is "an example of the self-subjugation of Germanic scholarship to völkisch-nationalistic and National Socialistic ideologies." Jan Hirschbiegel argues that Höfler's work served less to uncover new academic knowledge than to create an ideological foundation for the Nazi state, that Höfler's cultic group of Odin's warriors was meant as spiritual predecessor of the Nazi "death cult" and its "death symbolism", and that Höfler never distanced himself from the völkisch elements of his earlier work. Wolfgang Behringer and Klaus von See similarly point to his Kultische Geheimbünde der Germanen as, in Behringer's words, a "sensational apology for the SS".

Selected works

 Kultische Geheimbünde der Germanen, 1934
 Das germanische Kontinuitätsproblem, 1937
 Die politische Leistung der Völkerwanderungszeit, 1937
 Friedrich Gundolf und das Judentum in der Literaturwissenschaft, 1940
 Deutsche Heldensage, 1941
 Germanisches Sakralkönigtum, 1952
 Balders Bestattung und die nordischen Felszeichnungen, 1952
 Zur Diskussion über den Rökstein, 1954
 Das Opfer im Semnonenhain und die Edda, 1952
 Goethes Homunculus, 1963
 Verwandlungskulte, Volkssagen und Mythen, 1973
 Theoderich der Große und sein Bild in der Sage, 1975
 Siegfried, Arminius und der Nibelungenhort, 1978
 Kleine Schriften, 1992

See also

 Helmut Birkhan
 Robert Nedoma
 Rudolf Simek
 Herwig Wolfram
 Walter Steinhauser
 Franz Rolf Schröder
 Hans Kuhn (philologist)
 Werner Betz
 Kurt Schier
 Dietrich Kralik
 Blanka Horacek
 Friedrich Ranke
 Dennis Howard Green

References

Sources

Further reading

External links
 Otto Höfler at the website of the University of Vienna

1901 births
1987 deaths
Austrian expatriates in Germany
Austrian expatriates in Sweden
Austrian expatriates in Switzerland
Austrian non-fiction writers
Austrian philologists
Linguists from Austria
Academic staff of the Ludwig Maximilian University of Munich
Lund University alumni
Germanists
Germanic studies scholars
Old Norse studies scholars
Runologists
Scandinavian studies scholars
Scientists from Vienna
University of Basel alumni
University of Kiel alumni
University of Marburg alumni
University of Vienna alumni
Academic staff of the University of Vienna
Academic staff of Uppsala University
Writers on Germanic paganism
20th-century linguists
20th-century non-fiction writers
20th-century philologists